Cedric is a male given name.

Cedric may also refer to:

Cédric (comics), a Belgian comic strip
 Cedric (racehorse) (1821–1829), winner of the 1824 Derby
 Cedric (show jumping horse), gold medal winner at the 2008 Olympics
Cedric, Alabama
Nissan Cedric, a sedan car
RMS Cedric
Cédric Soares, a Portuguese football player